Over Here! is a musical with a score by Richard M. Sherman and Robert B. Sherman and book by Will Holt. The original Broadway production was directed by Tom Moore and choreographed by Patricia Birch, with scenic design by Douglas W. Schmidt and costumes by Carrie F. Robbins.

Over Here! was a follow-up to the Sherman brothers' World War II musical Victory Canteen, an off-Broadway production that featured 1940s icon Patty Andrews. The setting is a cross-country train trip in the United States during World War II (hence the name of the play, in contrast to the popular patriotic war anthem entitled Over There). The show begins as a nostalgic look at 1940s America (where fashion, music, big bands and swing dance dominates) but,  quickly evolves into a social commentary about the fear of dying in battle, prejudice, and discrimination.

Production history
After thirteen previews, the show opened on March 6, 1974 at the Shubert Theatre, where it ran for 341 performances and became the top-grossing production of the 1974 Broadway season. It is largely credited as the Broadway musical which launched many careers. The opening night cast included Patty  and Maxene Andrews (of the Andrews Sisters) and newcomers John Travolta, Treat Williams, Marilu Henner, Samuel E. Wright, and Ann Reinking, all of whom went on to achieve successful careers. Despite still playing to capacity audiences, the show closed on January 4, 1975 under controversial conditions. "The producers blamed Patty and Maxine, claiming they wanted more money and made unreasonable demands, and cancelled the national tour. The Andrews sisters blamed the producers, claiming they had mismanaged the show from the beginning and were now using them as scapegoats." According to an article in The New York Times, the tour was cancelled due to a "salary dispute" between the Andrews sisters and the producers.

Radar online and the official site reported that Cody Linley would be starring in an all-new production of Over Here! set to launch early in 2010 at the Saban Theatre, Beverly Hills and an official website showed open auditions. In an interview, Linley confirmed that he would play the role of Bill. The production has been postponed indefinitely.

The postponed 2010 production was an "all-new" production with a modified book by original playwright Will Holt, choreographed by Tony Stevens, designed by Royal Court designer Mark Walters with associate designer Christopher Hone and Costume Designer David Toser, featuring Music Supervision by David Barber. 
Dick Van Dyke had agreed to head an all-star cast; however, he was forced to withdraw days before the start date when his partner Michelle's illness became terminal. Unable to find an immediate replacement for Van Dyke at such short notice, the producers rescheduled the production to premiere in California in 2016, following which a US tour was planned. Neither came to fruition. 

There was a 2019 Off-Broadway revival at the Triad Theatre in New York City starring Debbie Gravitte, Haley Swindal as Pauline, Jessica Hendy as Paulette, Nikka Graff Lanzarone as Mitzi, Mark William, Dani Apple, and Kristina Nicole Miller. The production was adapted into a 85-minute one act by director Will Nunziata, music director Blake Allen, and choreographer Andrew Black. The revival featured all the music from the original Broadway production, albeit in a different order, except for "Don't Shoo the Hooey to Me, Louie". The third verse of "Star-Spangled Banner" was sung by Miller where in the original production, the anthem was spoken.

Song list

Act I
 The Beat Begins (Overture) - The Big Band
 Since You're Not Around - Makeout, Rankin, Mother, Father, Sarge and Company
 Over Here! - Paulette and Pauline de Paul
 Buy a Victory Bond - Company
 My Dream for Tomorrow - June and Bill
 Charlie's Place - Pauline de Paul, Maggie, Lucky, The Big Band and Company
 Hey Yvette/The Grass Grows Green - Spokesman, Rankin and Father
 The Good-Time Girl (later called "The V.D. Polka") - Paulette de Paul and Company
 Wait for Me Marlena - Mitzi and Company
 We Got It - Paulette de Paul, Pauline de Paul, Mitzi and Company

Act II
 The Beat Continues (Entr'acte) - The Big Band and Company
 Wartime Wedding - Paulette de Paul, Pauline de Paul and Company
 Don't Shoot the Hooey to Me, Louie - Sam
 Where Did the Good Times Go? - Paulette de Paul
 Dream Drummin'/Soft Music - Misfit, The Big Band and Company
 The Big Beat - Paulette de Paul, Pauline de Paul and Mitzi
 No Goodbyes - Paulette de Paul, Pauline de Paul and Company
Curtain Call
 Hits Medley - Patty and Maxene Andrews

Awards and nominations

Original Broadway production

2019 Revival

References

External links

The Sherman Brothers

Broadway musicals
1974 musicals
Musicals about World War II
Musicals by the Sherman Brothers
Tony Award-winning musicals